Sturminster may refer to:

 Sturminster Newton
 Sturminster Marshall